Princess Elisabeth, Duchess of Brabant (born 25 October 2001) is the heir apparent to the Belgian throne. The eldest child of King Philippe and Queen Mathilde, she acquired her position after her grandfather King Albert II abdicated in favour of her father on 21 July 2013.

Birth
The first child of the then Duke and Duchess of Brabant, Elisabeth was delivered by Caesarean section at 21:58 CET on 25 October 2001 at the Erasmus Hospital, the teaching hospital of Université libre de Bruxelles in Anderlecht, Brussels. She was baptized on 9 December 2001 in the chapel of Ciergnon Castle in the Belgian Ardennes, by Cardinal Godfried Danneels, the Archbishop of Mechelen-Brussels. Her godparents are Archduke Amedeo of Austria-Este (paternal cousin), and Countess Hélène d'Udekem d'Acoz (maternal aunt).

Education
Elisabeth studied at St John Berchmans College in the Marollen district of Brussels, which had been attended by her older cousins, the children of her paternal aunt, Princess Astrid of Belgium. This is a significant change in the habits of the royal family, as it is the first time that a future Belgian monarch's education has begun in Dutch. In 2018, she continued her secondary education at UWC Atlantic College in Wales and received her International Baccalaureate Diploma in 2020. She also attended the Yale Young Global Scholars Program at Yale University.

After her secondary school graduation in 2020, she spent a year at the Royal Military Academy Belgium in Brussels, studying Social and Military Sciences. She began studying history and politics at Lincoln College, University of Oxford in October 2021, while continues to attend Royal Military Academy Belgium's annual summer camps and other practical and theoretical military classes. She joined women's rowing team called W1 in Oxford's Torpids rowing race in February 2023.

Elisabeth speaks Dutch, French, German and English. She also took classes in Mandarin Chinese.

Activities 
Elisabeth's first public appearance was on 21 July 2006, when she accompanied her parents during a Te Deum for National Day celebrations in the Cathedral of St. Michael and St. Gudula. A year later, on 13 June 2007, Princess Elisabeth and her parents attended the opening of a new Technopolis youth interactive at Mechelen.

In 2009, Elisabeth gave her name to the Princess Elisabeth Antarctica Station, a Belgian scientific polar research station. In September 2011, the nine-year-old princess gave her first public speech (in Dutch) at the opening of Princess Elisabeth Children’s Hospital, part of Ghent University Hospital in Ghent. She gave her first official speech in 2014 during commemorations of the centenary of the outbreak of World War I. Princess Elisabeth became godmother of a patrol vessel named Pollux P902 on 6 May 2015 in Zeebrugge. In June 2019, the Duchess of Brabant and her mother traveled to Kenya for the United Nations Children's Fund, where they visited the Kakuma refugee camp. During the COVID-19 pandemic, Princess Elisabeth had conversations over the phone with elderly people in residential care centers in order to encourage and support them. On 21 July 2021, she was among the fellow students of the Royal Military Academy Belgium to parade during the Belgian National Day.

On 12 May 2022, Princess Elisabeth accompanied her aunt Princess Astrid on a visit to St Hilda's College. There, she and her aunt met St Hilda’s Principal Professor Dame Sarah Springman and Vice Chancellor of the University of Oxford Professor Louise Richardson. On 17 June 2022, together with her mother the Queen, she was among the royal guests invited to the celebrations of the 18th birthday of Princess Ingrid Alexandra of Norway. She carried her two first solo official engagements in the following week by christening the Belgian oceanographic research vessel RV Belgica and inaugurating KU Leuven's Princess Elisabeth Additive Manufacturing Lab. In March 2023, Elisabeth and her mother Queen Mathilde traveled to Egypt, where they visited archaeological sites. Elisabeth volunteers to help children with learning difficulties, the elderly, the homeless and people with a handicap.

Position
Ten years prior to Elisabeth's birth, a new act of succession was put into effect which introduced absolute primogeniture, meaning that she comes first in the line of succession because she is the eldest child. On 21 July 2013, once Elisabeth's father had taken the oath of office as King of the Belgians (his father, King Albert II, having abdicated shortly before), she became heir apparent to the throne and as such bears the title of Duchess of Brabant. If she ascends to the throne as expected, she will be Belgium's first female monarch.

Eponym 

 Princess Elisabeth Antarctica (2009)
 Princess Elisabeth Children's Hospital (2011)
 Princess Elisabeth Park (2019)
 Microcostatus elisabethianus
 Athénée Royal Princesse Elisabeth
 Princess Elisabeth Additive Manufacturing Lab (2022)
 Princess Elisabeth Island

Titles, styles and honour
25 October 2001 – 21 July 2013: Her Royal Highness Princess Elisabeth of Belgium
21 July 2013 – present: Her Royal Highness Princess Elisabeth, The Duchess of Brabant

Honour

 : Knight Grand Cordon of the Order of Leopold  (25 October 2019)

Arms

See also 
 List of current heirs apparent

References

External links
Belgian Monarchy-Princess Elisabeth

2001 births
Living people
House of Belgium
Belgian princesses
Dukes of Brabant
Princesses of Saxe-Coburg and Gotha
Female heirs apparent
People from Anderlecht
Belgian people of Danish descent
Belgian people of German descent
Belgian people of Italian descent
Belgian people of Polish descent
Belgian people of Swedish descent
Daughters of kings
People educated at Atlantic College
People educated at a United World College